Running with Wolves or  Running with the Wolves may refer to:

"Running with Wolves", a song by Zebrahead from their 2015 album Walk the Plank
Running with the Wolves, 2015 EP by Norwegian singer Aurora
"Running with the Wolves" (song), the title track of the same EP
"Running with the Wolves", from the soundtrack of the 2020 film Eurovision Song Contest: The Story of Fire Saga